Eleonora Giorgi (born 21 October 1953) is an Italian actress.

Biography 
Giorgi was born in Rome. Her father was of Italian and English origin. Her mother was of Italian and Hungarian origin.

She made her film debut in a minor role in Paolo Cavara's horror film Black Belly of the Tarantula (1970) and subsequently appeared in nearly fifty films, mostly in prominent roles. Domenico Paolella's Story of a Cloistered Nun (1973), an important nunsploitation, marked her film debut, at age eighteen. She then took part in Il bacio (The kiss), a fantasy drama directed by Mario Lanfranchi, and in erotic comedies such as Salvatore Samperi's La sbandata (1974), in which she plays near Domenico Modugno and Luciana Paluzzi, Luciano Salce's Alla mia cara mamma nel giorno del suo compleanno (1974), Pasquale Festa Campanile's Conviene far bene l'amore (U.S. title: Love and Energy) (1975) and Gianluigi Calderone's Appassionata, that definitively gaine her the public acclaim.  Roles in movies like Franco Brusati's To Forget Venice (1979), Dario Argento's Inferno (1980), Nino Manfredi's Nudo di donna (1981), and Liliana Cavani's Beyond Obsession (1982) are some of her most known and remarkable dramatic performances but in the beginning of the eighties, Giorgi decides to rejoin comedy. She's near Adriano Celentano in Mani di velluto and Grand hotel excelsior; for her performance in Carlo Verdone's Borotalco (1982), she won the Nastro d'Argento award and David di Donatello award for Best Actress.

In 2003, Giorgi wrote and directed her first film Uomini & donne, amori & bugie (U.S. title: Love, Lies, Kids... & Dogs), with Ornella Muti.

Filmography 
 Story of a cloistered nun, directed by Domenico Paolella (1973)
 Appassionata, directed by Gianluigi Calderone (1974)
 The Kiss, directed by Mario Lanfranchi (1974)
 Alla mia cara mamma nel giorno del suo compleanno, directed by Luciano Salce (1974)
 La sbandata, directed by Alfredo Malfatti (supervised by Salvatore Samperi) (1974)
 Conviene far bene l'amore, directed by Pasquale Festa Campanile (1975)
 Cuore di cane, directed by Alberto Lattuada (1975)
 Young, Violent, Dangerous, directed by Romolo Guerrieri (1976)
 And Agnes Chose to Die, directed by Giuliano Montaldo (1976)
 L'ultima volta, directed by Aldo Lado (1976)
 Ready for Anything, directed by Giorgio Stegani (1977)
 A Spiral of Mist, directed by Eriprando Visconti (1977)
 Ca fait tilt, directed by Andrè Hunebelle (1977)
 Suggestionata, directed by Alfredo Rizzo (1978)
 Safari Rally, directed by Bitto Albertini (1978)
 To Forget Venice, directed by Franco Brusati (1979)
 A Man on His Knees, directed by Damiano Damiani (1979)
 Velvet Hands, directed by Castellano & Pipolo (1980)
 Inferno, directed by Dario Argento (1980)
 Mia moglie è una strega, directed by Castellano & Pipolo (1980)
 Portrait of a Woman, Nude, directed by Nino Manfredi (1981)
 Talcum Powder, directed by Carlo Verdone (1982)
 Beyond the Door, directed by Liliana Cavani (1982)
 Grand Hotel Excelsior, directed by Castellano & Pipolo (1983)
 Mani di fata, directed by Steno (1983)
 Sapore di mare 2 – Un anno dopo, directed by Bruno Cortini (1983)
 Vediamoci chiaro, directed by Luciano Salce (1984)
 Giovanni Senzapensieri, Marco Colli (1986)
 Compagni di scuola, Carlo Verdone (1988)
 Il volpone, directed by Maurizio Ponzi (1988)
 SoloMetro, directed by Marco Cucurnia (2007)
 My Father Jack (2016)
 Attesa e Cambiamenti (2016)

Discography

Singles 
 "Quale appuntamento/Messaggio Personale" – Dischi Ricordi (1981)

References

External links 

1953 births
Actresses from Rome
Italian film actresses
Italian television actresses
Italian film producers
Italian screenwriters
Living people
David di Donatello winners
Nastro d'Argento winners
Italian women film directors
Film directors from Rome
Italian people of Hungarian descent
Italian people of British descent